Francesco "Frank" Talia (born 20 July 1972 in Melbourne) is an Australian former professional soccer goalkeeper, who  last played for Wycombe Wanderers in Football League Two.

Career

Early career
He was an Australian Institute of Sport scholarship holder from 1989 to 1990. 
Talia began his career at Australian club Sunshine Georgies before moving to Blackburn Rovers in August 1992.

Although he was at the club for three years, Talia did not make any first-team appearances for Blackburn and following this he moved to Swindon Town in September 1995 after a loan spell at Hartlepool United.

For a while, he was Blackburn's second choice goalkeeper behind Bobby Mimms before the arrival of Tim Flowers in November 1993, and had been issued with the number 13 shirt with the introduction of squad numbers for the 1993-94 season in the FA Premier League. He made several appearances as a non-playing substitute, the last at Wembley Stadium in August 1995 when he watched from the bench as Blackburn (Premier League champions) were beaten 1-0 by Everton in the FA Charity Shield. FootballSquads - Blackburn Rovers - 1993/94

Talia made over 100 appearances in five years at Swindon winning the player of the year award in 2000 before moving to Sheffield United in September 2000, where he made six appearances.

In March 2002, Talia signed a short-term contract with English Division 2 side Reading, sitting on the bench for the final six games of the season.

Wycombe
Lawrie Sanchez signed Talia for Wycombe in August 2002 on a free transfer as cover for regular Wycombe goalkeeper Martin Taylor. His chance came against Bristol City after Taylor developed a back problem and he continued in goal after Taylor gashed his knee at the Wycombe's training ground. Talia then made over 100 appearances for the club, despite being sidelined when he sliced his toe with a lawn-mower in 2004  and a knee injury that side-lined him for six months in August 2006,.

References

External links
Official Wycombe profile

1972 births
Living people
Soccer players from Melbourne
Australian people of Italian descent
Association football goalkeepers
Australian expatriate soccer players
Expatriate footballers in England
Expatriate footballers in Belgium
English Football League players
Belgian Pro League players
Blackburn Rovers F.C. players
Hartlepool United F.C. players
Royal Antwerp F.C. players
Sheffield United F.C. players
Swindon Town F.C. players
Wolverhampton Wanderers F.C. players
Wycombe Wanderers F.C. players
Australian Institute of Sport soccer players
Australian soccer players
Australian expatriate sportspeople in Belgium
Australian expatriate sportspeople in England